Corona Senior High School (CHS) is a California Distinguished School high school in the city of Corona, California, United States, a growing city in the Inland Empire of Southern California. CHS is one of eight high schools in the Corona-Norco Unified School District.

History
CHS was the first high school in the area, established in 1894 when high school students met in the upper floor of the Corona Grammar school located in what now is called Victoria Park. The second Corona High School was built at 1230 S. Main Street, the current location of Corona Fundamental Intermediate School. This location opened as Corona High School in 1907. By the early twenties, the town out grew this campus and a third Corona High School location was needed. It opened in 1923 and was constructed, in the Mediterranean Revival style, at 815 West Sixth Street. This campus was designed by G. Stanley Wilson, an architect from Riverside, California, who had also designed parts of the Mission Inn. This campus remained in use as a high school until December 1960, when once again, the number of students exceeded its capacity After the high school moved from its third campus, the campus became Corona's Civic Center and City Hall. This third high school building is now listed on the National Register of Historic Places.

The high school was relocated to 1150 West Tenth Street during the 196061 school year to accommodate a rapidly growing number of students wishing to attend. There were no graduates in 1897.{{citation From One Room ISBN 978-0-615-88887-3}

Students
Corona High School has a diverse student population of more than 4,000 students including; 4.3% African American and 54.0% Hispanic or Latino. White students make up approximately 35.1% of the student population. As of 2005 it was reported that 45.1% of the students at Corona High School come from socioeconomically disadvantaged homes. Although nearly half the students come from disadvantaged families, they comprise one of the highest graduation levels in the state with 94.6%.

Assertive Discipline at Corona High School is a consistency-based approach to classroom and school discipline. It is designed to create a positive educational atmosphere and provide educators with skills and confidence necessary to effectively reduce discipline problems. Every classroom has a set of assertive discipline program charts posted in the room. Teachers discuss the rules and the positive and negative consequences of the program with their students. The practices and procedures for discipline, tardiness, and truancy are aimed at teaching responsibility and building positive self-esteem. Each student receives the teacher's discipline plan included as part of the course syllabus. Corona High School exhibits pride, high morale, order and discipline, and respect for individual rights and responsibilities. In the 20052006 school year there were a total of 337 suspensions and 20 expulsions at Corona High School, well below the District average.

Academics
Corona's course offerings reflect the diversity of the school community. Classes offered include career/technical classes, honors and advance placement, a four-year AVID program, English acquisition, sheltered classes in core subjects, visual and performing arts, and special education.

All students are offered a core academic curriculum which stresses academic excellence. Advanced Placement and honors courses are offered in Math, Science, Language Arts, Social Science, and Foreign Language. Educational programs are provided to enhance the educational opportunities for disadvantaged, ESL, and Special Education students.

Students have the opportunity to enroll in advanced placement (AP) courses at Corona High School. Students who successfully pass an optional end-of-course exam generally receive college credit. Of the 302 Advanced Placement Exams taken in Music Theory, English Literature, French and Spanish Languages, Calculus, Sciences (such as Biology and Physics), and Social Sciences (such as European History and Psychology), 61% passed. The school district passing rate was 48.2%. The Riverside County, California state and national passing rates were 45.6%, 57.1%, and 59.6% respectively.

The instructional program at Corona High School is based on the state's Academic Content Standards. Higher-level thinking skills are emphasized at all grade levels for all students. Teachers use criterion-referenced tests, teacher-made tests, common benchmark assessments, portfolios, and observations to assess student performance. Planning days and minimum days enable teachers to appropriately plan the cooperative delivery of instruction in support of the core curriculum to all students.

Teachers are an important part of the leadership of Corona High School. The staff serves on grade-level and subject-department teams to plan curriculum and recommend solutions to problems. Staff members communicate and learn from each other, both formally and informally.

Students with special needs are served in a variety of ways. The Student Study Team (SST) is a site-based group that works to provide modifications of and accommodations to the general education program. Modifications or accommodations could be provided by support personnel, such as school counselors, nurses, or psychologists. Intensive modifications/accommodations may require special education services which include, but are not limited to, special education itinerant services (for example, speech and language, adaptive physical education, occupational therapy), and resource specialists or special day class programs.

Sports
Corona High School offers a full range of sports, many of which have participated in CIF playoffs, and/or have won CIF Divisional championships. Booster clubs have added significant strength to many of the sports and organizations.

Fall Sports: Football, Boys Water Polo, Boys Cross Country, Girls Cross Country, Girls Tennis, Girls Volleyball, Girls Pep Squad.
Winter Sports: Boys Basketball, Girls Basketball, Girls Soccer, Boys Soccer, Girls Water Polo, Wrestling.
Spring Sports: Baseball, Softball, Golf, Girls Swimming, Boys Swimming, Girls Track, Boys Track, Boys Tennis, Boys Lacrosse, Girls Lacrosse, Boys Volleyball.

Performing arts
Corona High also offers a performing arts program with dramas, musicals, five choirs, marching/pep band, jazz band, symphonic band and video production which used to run the only daily live news broadcast in the Corona-Norco Unified District.

Clubs on campus

Corona High School offers a broad range of clubs, societies, organizations and student interest groups which have continuously received District, Regional, Statewide, and in the case of History Day projects, National recognition. Clubs Have on campus supervisors. Clubs are to have elected officers in which the students will choose, to run meetings. A proposed budget, constitution, charter and approval from the Activities Director and Administration is required to start any club.

Notable alumni

Andy Avalos - Head coach at Boise State
Brendan Beck - professional baseball player, San Francisco Giants organization
Tristan Beck - professional baseball player, San Francisco Giants organization
Erica Blasberg - golfer who played on the LPGA Tour
Scott Bloomquist - Hall of Fame dirt racer
Ken Calvert - Congressman, House of Representatives: 44th congressional district
Darrin Chiaverini - Former NFL receiver and current college coach
Ryan Chiaverini - Television personality}
Mike Darr - Former Major League baseball player, San Diego Padres
Heath Farwell - Former NFL linebacker and pro bowler
Brian Hildebrand - Former Division 1 quarterback, Oregon State Beavers
Jess Hill - Former Major League baseball player (1935–37), USC football coach (1951–56), USC athletic director (1957–72)
George Ingalls - Congressional Medal of Honor Recipient
Joe Kelly - professional baseball player, Los Angeles Dodgers organization
Mr. Mixx (David P. Hobbs) - Hip hop DJ, producer, co-founder of 2 Live Crew
Jennifer Ruiz - Professional soccer player
Matt Spanos - Former USC lineman
Demetrius Wright - USC Trojans free safety

References

External links

Corona High School State Required 'Report Card'
 

High schools in Riverside County, California
Buildings and structures in Corona, California
Education in Corona, California
Public high schools in California
National Register of Historic Places in Riverside County, California
School buildings on the National Register of Historic Places in California
Landmarks of Riverside County, California
1897 establishments in California
Educational institutions established in 1897
Mission Revival architecture in California